Primrose Green is the second studio album by American musician Ryley Walker. It was released in March 2015 under Dead Oceans Records.

Reception

Accolades

Track listing

References

2015 albums
Dead Oceans albums
Ryley Walker albums